The 2018–19 Atlantic 10 Conference men's basketball season was the 43rd season of Atlantic 10 Conference basketball. The season began with practices in October 2018, followed by the start of the 2018–19 NCAA Division I men's basketball season in November. League play began in late December and ended in March.

The 2019 Atlantic 10 tournament was held from March 13–17, 2019 at the Barclays Center in Brooklyn, New York.

Rhode Island was the defending regular season champion, while Davidson was the defending Tournament champions.

Head coaches

Coaching changes 
On March 22, 2018, Rhode Island announced that head coach Dan Hurley had accepted the head coaching job at Connecticut. On April 4, assistant coach David Cox was promoted to head coach.

On March 23, 2018, La Salle head coach John Giannini and the school mutually agreed to part ways after 14 seasons. Giannini left with a 212–226 record at La Salle. On April 8, the school hired Villanova assistant Ashley Howard as head coach.

Coaches 

Notes:
 All records, appearances, titles, etc. are from time with current school only.
 Overall and A-10 records are from time at current school through the end of the 2017–18 season.

Conference matrix 
This table summarizes the head-to-head results between teams in conference play. Each team will play 18 conference games: one game vs. eight opponents and two games against five opponents.

Preseason

Preseason poll 
Prior to the season at the conference's annual media day, awards and a poll were chosen by a panel of the league's head coaches and select media members.

Preseason All-Conference Teams

Regular season

Early season tournaments

Postseason

2019 A-10 Tournament

2019 NCAA Tournament 

Two teams from the Atlantic 10 qualified for the NCAA Tournament. Tournament champions Saint Louis qualified through the conference's automatic bid, and regular season champions, VCU, qualified through an at-large bid. It was the 14th straight season in which the conference earned an at-large bid.

2019 NIT 

Two teams from the Atlantic 10 earned at-large bids into the NIT.

References